The 1919 Washington University Pikers football team was an American football team that represented Washington University in St. Louis as a member of the Missouri Valley Conference (MVC) during the 1919 college football season. In its third and final season under head coach R. B. Rutherford, the team compiled a 5–2 record (2–2 against MVC opponents), tied for third place in the conference, and outscored opponents by a total of 127 to 30.

Schedule

References

Washington University
Washington University Bears football seasons
Washington University Pikers football